The 1947 Chinese National Assembly election was held between 21 and 23 November 1947 in China. This is the first election of under the newly ratified 1947 Constitution of the Republic of China. Under this constitution, the National Assembly is an authoritative legislature body that holds the power as constitutional convention and presidential electoral college. A total of 2,961 delegates were elected from across the country.

Background 
Following the establishment of Republic of China, indirect elections were held in 1912 and 1918 for the National Assembly, 1931 for the Nationals Assembly and 1936 for Constitutional Assembly.

In December 1946, the Constitutional Assembly adopted the new Constitution, effective from 25 December 1947. Delegates for National Assembly shall be elected before the constitution came into effect, which would be similar to Electoral College in the United States. In April 1947, China Democratic Socialist Party and Chinese Youth Party entered the re-organised Nationalist government. The two minority parties demanded to field 238 and 288 candidates in the election, despite significantly higher than their representations in the Constitutional Assembly. They also proposed the proportional representation in the election and was rejected. John Leighton Stuart, Ambassador of the United States to China, criticised the minority of their greed for power. He later recommended postponing the election as it could endanger peace negotiation of civil war, but Chiang insisted the election as the key step for constitutional governance.

Overview, criticism, reactions 
The election was held between 21 and 23 November 1947 across China. Single non-transferable vote was used as the electoral system. With an empty ballot, voters were required to write down the name of the candidates voting for. Along with underdeveloped voter identification system, large number of invalid ballots were found and fraud was widely reported.

The election received mixed reaction within China, with some praising the expansion of voting rights to women and farmers while denouncing the election as lacking other essential elements of democracy, but still general appreciation internationally. Ambassador Stuart commented that, despite the unsatisfactory conditions of the election, the election marked the start of democracy in China.

Results

Turnout 

According to Central News Agency, the official broadcaster, and Ta Kung Pao, there were around 250 million of eligible voters, compared to a total population of 461 million. Official newspaper Central Daily News, however, gave the number of voters at 350 million. The Government reported the turnout at 20 million, despite neutral observers doubted whether the total reached 10 million. With the government reported figures, the turnout was at 8%.

Elections could not be organised or could partly conducted in provinces or cities occupied or controlled by the Communist troops or Soviet forces, such as Dairen, Tsitsihar, Harbin, Lyushun, affecting around 800 to 900 constituencies as per government report. Turnout in cities was higher than rural area, with more than half of voters casting ballots in Canton. Overseas voting were met with legal obstacles relating to nationality, especially in the United Kingdom and the colonies, but the electoral procedures in the United States were carried out quite successful as dual citizenships were permitted.

Seats breakdown 
In principle, the electoral districts were designed to elect one delegate for each county or equivalent of China. China recognized the result of the 1945 Mongolian independence referendum, hence this election was only held in the Mongolian leagues and banners within provinces of China, or roughly the territory of modern Inner Mongolia. The Tibetan electoral districts includes the Tibet Area as well as the Tibetan regions within provinces of China. Most of Tibet were controlled by the semi-independent Kashag government at this time.

Party breakdown 
The opposition parties urged Kuomintang to ensure the quota of elected delegates be reached prior to the election, reportedly at 230 and 202 for the Youth and Democratic Socialist respectively. Kuomintang is suggested to have won "in landslide", taking at least 80% of legislative seats, equivalent to more than 2,000 seats in National Assembly. Many Kuomintang-nominated candidates, however, still lost in the election, while party members nominated by voters won. Kuomintang later passed a controversial and unconstitutional resolution, forcing those elected delegates with KMT affiliation to give up their seats such as to fulfill the demand from the opposition, as they threatened to withdraw from the National Assembly in protest. The chaos following the resolution forced the meeting to postpone from 25 December 1947 to 29 March 1948, and only ended as it was declared seats would not needed to be given up.

Due to the lack of data over the political affiliation of elected delegates, the numbers below were estimations from the given details.

Results in Taiwan 
The islands of Taiwan and Penghu were under Japanese rule before 15 August 1945. Before World War II, few Taiwanese people were selected by the Government of Japan to participate the Imperial Diet. As a result of World War II, the Republic of China Armed Forces occupied Taiwan on behalf of the Allies. The government established Taiwan Province to mark its annexation of Taiwan.

The administrative divisions of Taiwan consist of 8 counties and 9 cities. However, an additional delegate seat were added to Taichung County and Tainan County respectively due to their population. There were 19 delegates elected in this election.

Aftermath 

The election was organized by the Kuomintang-led Nationalist government. Elected National Assembly delegates started its first session on 29 March 1948 in Nanking. The exact number of delegates attending the meeting remained unknown due to numerous circumstances, such as deaths before or after election, declined to inaugurate, resigned after the first meeting, or disqualified for law offenses. Records showed 2,859, among 2,961 elected, reported the attendance in the opening of the National Assembly first meeting. The number of attendees increased to 2,878 when the meeting reached the end on 1 May 1948.

The inauguration of the first National Assembly marks the transition of China into constitutional governance. Chiang Kai-shek, the leader of the Nationalist government, was elected by the National Assembly delegates in the later presidential election to be the first President of the Republic of China in the constitutional government.

However, the Kuomintang-led Government of the Republic of China lost the Chinese Civil War in the next year of 1949. This resulted the government to retreat to Taiwan. Around half of the National Assembly delegates came to Taiwan with the government. Since the government had lost control over mainland China. The delegates extended their own terms until "re-election is possible in their original electoral district." This situation remained until a Constitutional Court (Judicial Yuan) decision in June 1991 that orders the terms to terminate by the end of 1991.

The National Assembly delegates elected actually served in office from 29 March 1948 to 31 December 1991, which equals 43 years and 278 days.

Related elections

Previous and next legislative elections 
There were some regime changes happened in China during the first half of the 20th century. Depends on the definition, possible previous and next elections for legislatures with similar functions are listed below.

Presidential elections in National Assembly 
The government of the Republic of China claims the sovereignty over the whole China. However, due to the inability to hold re-elections in mainland China after 1949, the National Assembly delegates elected in 1947 still held elections in Taiwan to elect the President and Vice President every 6 years in accordance with the constitution. This situation remained until the democratization took place in Taiwan in the 1990s under the Lee Teng-hui administration.

Gallery

See also 
 Nationalist government
 Constitution of the Republic of China
 Temporary Provisions against the Communist Rebellion
 National Assembly (Republic of China)
 1948 Chinese legislative election

References 

1947 in China
China
Legislative elections in the Republic of China (1912–1949)
Taiwanese National Assembly elections
November 1947 events in Asia